Un autre monde is a 1984 album by Téléphone.

Un autre monde, French for Another world, may also refer to:

 Un autre monde (film), or Another World, a 2021 French film
 "Un autre monde", an 1895 short story by J.-H. Rosny aîné
 Un autre monde, an illustrated book by Jean Ignace Isidore Gérard Grandville